Wielgowo is a part of the city of Szczecin, Poland situated on the right bank of Oder river, east of the Szczecin Old Town, and Szczecin-Dąbie.

Before 1945, when Stettin (Szczecin) belonged to Germany, the German name of this suburb was Stettin-Augustwalde.

Official www site

Wielgowo